Gelanor waorani is a species of neotropical spiders from South America (Colombia, Ecuador, Brazil) in the family Mimetidae.

References

Mimetidae
Spiders described in 2016
Spiders of South America